Randers Cimbria is a Danish basketball team based in Randers. The best season of the team in history were 2014 and 2020, when they finished second in the Basketligaen.

History
Randers was founded in 1965, but after winning the bronze medal in 2008-09 they were declared bankrupt, and were relegated to the 2. division. In 2011-12 they were again promoted to the best liga in Denmark, and have been there since.

Honours
Basketligaen
Runners-up (2): 2013–14, 2019–20
Bronze (2): 2008-09, 2017-18

Players

Current roster

Individual awards
Basketligaen MVP
 Bonell Colas – 2009

Basketligaen Best Defender
 Bonell Colas – 2012/13

Basketligaen Best Coach
 Mark Collins – 2008/9
 Jimmy Moore – 2019/20

Season by season

References

Basketball teams in Denmark
1965 establishments in Denmark
Basketball teams established in 1965